"Monster" is a song by the American all-female rock group L7. It was released as a single in support of their third album Bricks Are Heavy.

Track listing 
UK 7" single (LASH 38)
"Monster" (Suzi Gardner) – 2:59
"Used to Love Him" (Guns N' Roses cover) (Steven Adler, Duff McKagan, Axl Rose, Slash, Izzy Stradlin) – 2:14

UK CD single (LASCD 38)
"Monster" (Suzi Gardner) – 2:59
"Used to Love Him" (Guns N' Roses cover) (Steven Adler, Duff McKagan, Axl Rose, Slash, Izzy Stradlin) – 2:14
"Diet Pill" (Donita Sparks) – 4:21

Charts

Personnel
Adapted from the Monster liner notes.

L7
 Jennifer Finch – bass guitar
 Suzi Gardner – lead vocals, electric guitar
 Demetra Plakas – drums
 Donita Sparks – electric guitar

Production and additional personnel
 Mr. Colson – engineering
 Steve Marker – engineering
 Clare Muller – cover art
 Butch Vig – production, recording
 Howie Weinberg – mastering

Release history

References

External links 
 

1992 songs
1992 singles
L7 (band) songs
Song recordings produced by Butch Vig
Songs written by Suzi Gardner
Slash Records singles
Songs against capitalism